Árbenz is a surname that may refer to the Guatemalan political family of Swiss origin:
Arabella Árbenz (1940–1965), Guatemalan fashion model and actress
Jacobo Árbenz (1913–1971), President of Guatemala from 1951 to 1954
Jacobo Arbenz Vilanova (born 1946), Guatemalan politician
Maria Cristina Villanova de Árbenz (1915–2009), First Lady of Guatemala from 1951 to 1954 and wife of Jacobo Árbenz

Guatemalan people of Swiss descent
Swiss-language surnames
Surnames of Swiss origin